is a freight terminal on the Kagoshima Main Line in Moji-ku, Kitakyūshū, Japan, operated by Japan Freight Railway Company (JR Freight).

The freight terminal opened on March 23, 2002.

References
 Kitakyūshū Freight Railway Facilities Possession K.K. 

Railway stations in Fukuoka Prefecture
Railway stations in Japan opened in 2002
Stations of Japan Freight Railway Company
Railway freight terminals in Japan